Psammonsella is a genus of mites in the family Ologamasidae.

Species
 Psammonsella nobskae Haq, 1965

References

Ologamasidae